Toxidia melania, the black skipper or dark grass-skipper, is a butterfly of the family Hesperiidae. It is endemic to the rainforests of tropical Queensland, Australia.

The wingspan is about 30 mm.

The larvae feed on Poaceae species. They construct a shelter by rolling a leaf into a tube or joining several leaves together. It rests in this shelter during the day.

External links
Australian Insects
Australian Faunal Directory

Trapezitinae
Butterflies described in 1903
Butterflies of Australia